(13 February 1929 – 10 June 1996) was a Japanese comedian, actor, and musician.

Career
From his days at Keio University, Sakai worked as a jazz drummer at American Army camps during the Occupation of Japan, often doing comic routines with his music. Becoming a professional comedian, he appeared in many famous film comedies such as Sun in the Last Days of the Shogunate and the Shachō and Ekimae series at the Toho Studios. He was named best actor at the Blue Ribbon Awards for his work in Sun in the Last Days of the Shogunate and Shiawase wa orera no negai.

He also appeared in musicals such as Kimi mo shusse ga dekiru, serious dramas such as I Want to Be a Shellfish, and kaiju eiga like Mothra. He was also known for his personal study of the ukiyo-e artist Sharaku and helped produce the film Sharaku directed by Masahiro Shinoda.  He is best known to American audiences for his dramatic role in the 1980s television production of Shōgun in which he played the part of Lord Yabu.

He died of liver failure on 10 June 1996 at the age of 67.

Selected filmography

Films

 Seishun jazu musume (1953)
 Musume jûroku jazz matsuri (1954)
 Jazz on Parade 1954 nen: Tokyo Cinderella musume (1954)
 Hatsukoi kanariya musume (1955) - Furakichi
 Ai no onimotsu (1955)
 Jazz on Parade: Jazz musume kampai! (1955) - Fura-san
  (1955) - Pierrot
 Tokyo baka odori (1956)
 Chika kara kita otoko (1956) - Shimpei Takiguchi
 Zoku ueru tamashii (1956)
 Gyûnyû ya Furankî (1956) - Rukuheita Sakai / Kogorô Sakai
 Tange Sazen: Kenun no maki (1956)
 Otemba san'nin shimai: Odoru taiyô (1957) - Kunio Yamato
 Frankie Bûchan no Aa gunkanki (1957)
  (1957) - Gorô Sudô
  (1957) - Inokori Saheiji, the stayer
 Sun in the Last Days of the Shogunate (1957) - Inokori Saheiji, the stayer
 Frankie Bûchan no zoku aa gunkaki: Nyogo ga-shima funsenki (1957)
 Man Who Causes a Storm (1957) - Man in jail (uncredited)
 A Boy and Three Mothers (1958) - Seiji, the Farher
 Buttsuke homban (1958) - Tetsuo Matsumoto
 Kigeki ekimae ryokan (1958) - Kinichi Koyama
 Furanki no sannin mae (1958)
 Gurama-to no yuwaku (1959) - Tamenaga
 Aisaiki (1959)
 Moro no Ichimatsu yûrei dochu (1959)
 Abarenbo miri ni Ishimatsu (1959)
  (1959)
  (1959)
 Kashima ari (1959)
 Shiranami gonin otoko: tenka no ô-dorobô (1960)
 Hito mo arukeba (1960) - Keima Sunagawa
 Yurei Hanjo-ki (1960) - Hachigogo
 Dokuritsu gurentai nishi-e (1960)
 'Akasaka no shimai' yori: yoru no hada (1960) - Junpei Tanabe
 Â jonan (1960)
 Shima no sehiro no oyabun-shû (1961)
 Tokkyu Nippon (1961) - Kiichi
 Tôkyô yawa (1961) - Ken-chan
 Onna wa nido umareru (1961) - Nozaki
  (1961) - Senichiro 'Sen-chan' Fukuda
 Kigeki: ekimae danchi (1961)
 Minami no shima ni yuki ga furu (1961)
  (1961) - Mokichi Tamura
 Kigeki ekimae bentô (1961)
 Salary man Shimizu minato (1962) - Kyû Rokkan
 Hagure kigeki mandara (1962)
 Shachô yôkôki (1962)
 Zoku shachô yôkôki (1962)
 Heso no taisho (1962)
 Ao beka monogatari (1962) - Goro
 Kigeki ekimae onsen (1962) - Jirô Sakai
 Shin kitsune to tanuki (1962)
 Chikata nikki (1962)
 Chūshingura: Hana no Maki, Yuki no Maki (1962) - Heigorô
 Kigeki ekimae hanten (1962)
 Kigeki: Detatoko shôbu - 'Chinjarara monogatari' yori (1962) - Nadare no Sabu
 Shachô manyûki (1963)
 Onna ni tsuyoku naru kufû no kazukazu (1963) - Nobuo Koyama
 Zoku shachô manyûki (1963)
 Shachô gaiyûki (1963) - Willie Tanaka
 Kigeki: Tonkatsu ichidai (1963) - Shinichi Tamaki
 Kawachi udoki-Oiroke hanjoki (1963)
 Zoku shachô gaiyûki (1963)
 Charan boran monogatari (1963)
 Daidokoro taiheiki (1963)
 Kigeki ekimae chagama (1963)
 Todan Goro ichiza (1963)
 Wanpaku tenshi (1963)
 Shachô shinshiroku (1964)
 Kigeki ekimae okami (1964) - Jirô Ban'no
 Misuta jaiantsu (1964)
 Zoku shachô shinshiroku (1964)
 Kigeki: Yôki-na mibôjin (1964) - Ghost / Shunji Ogata / Assistant Professor Kida / Junji Shimamichi / an acupressure therapist / Haruo Taniyama / Middle-aged Man
  (1964) - Zenta Yamakawa
 Kigeki ekimae kaidan (1964)
 Kigeki ekimae ondo (1964)
 Kigeki ekimae tenjin (1964)
 Shachô ninpôchô (1965)
 Kigeki ekimae iin (1965)
 Zoku shachô ninpôchô (1965) - Tsuyoshi Kebanai
 Kigeki ekimae kinyû (1965)
 Rokunin no onna o koroshita otoko (1965)
 Hana no o-Edo no hôkaibô (1965) - Hokaibo
 Kigeki ekimae daigaku (1965)
 Anma taiheiki (1965)
 Shachô gyôjôki (1966)
 Kigeki ekimae benten (1966)
 Zoku shachô gyôjôki (1966) - Tsuyoshi Kebanai
 Kigeki ekimae manga (1966) - Jiro Sakai
 Kigeki ekimae bantô (1966)
 Dark the Mountain Snow (1966) - Jiro
 Kigeki ekimae keiba (1966)
 Shachô senichiya (1967)
 Kigeki ekimae mangan (1967) - Jiro Sakai
 Râmen taishi (1967)
 Kigeki ekimae gakuen (1967)
 Zoku shachô senichiya (1967)
 Kigeki ekimae tanken (1967)
 Kigeki ekimae hyakku-nen (1967)
 Kigeki ekimae kaiun (1968)
 Kigeki ekimae kazan (1968) - Jiro Sakai
 Kawachi fûten zoku (1968) - Fûkichi
 Hakuchû dôdô (1968) - Lawyer Sakashita
 Kigeki: Otto urimasu (1968)
 Dorifutazu desu yo! Totte totte torimakure (1968)
 Kigeki ekimae sanbashi (1969) - Jiro Sakai
 Yotarô senki (1969) - Yotarô Akimoto
 Yosakoi ryoko (1969) - Goichi Hasegawa
 Gyakuten ryoko (1969) - Goichi Hasegawa
 Mastermind (1969) - Captain Yamada
 Shin Yotarô senki (1969) - Yotarô Akimoto
 Gokudô petenshi (1969)
 Chibikko Remi to meiken Capi (1970) - Kapi (voice)
 Kigeki aa gunka (1970)
 Onna kumichô (1970)
 Kigeki Kaiun ryokô (1971)
 Kigeki: Inochi no nedan (1971)
 Kawaii akujo: Koroshi no mae nikuchidzukeo (1972) - Deputy head
 Kigeki kaidan ryokô (1972)
 Love of a Bad Woman-Kiss Before the Killing (1972)
 Kigeki otoko no komoriuta (1972)
 Miyamoto Musashi (1973) - Honiden Matahachi
 Machi no hi (1973) - Cosmetic surgery
 Orenochi wa Taninnochi (1974) - Rokosuke Sawamura
 Miyamoto Musashi II (1974)
 Miyamoto Musashi (1974)
 Kigeki-otoko no ude dameshi (1974)
 Ganbare! Wakadaishô (1975)
 Hana no kô-ni trio: Hatsukoi jidai (1975) - Ippei Yazawa
 Gekitotsu! Wakadaishô (1976)
 Kigeki hyakkuten manten (1976)
 Nihon no jingi (1977)
 Dainamaito don don (1978) - Tokuemon
 Tsubasa wa kokoro ni tsukete (1978) - Nobuo Suzuki
 Hawaian rabu: Kikenna hanemûn (1978) - Frank Ômori
 Vengeance Is Mine (1979) - Inspector Kawai
 Hokusai manga (1981) - Nakajima Ise
 Arashi o yobu otoko (1983) - Raymond
 Kokushi muso (1986) - Isenokami
  (1987) - Yorishige Inada
 Ore wa otokoda! kanketsu-hen (1987)
 Aitsu (1991) - Tadashi Ono
 Sono kido o tootte (1993) - Gonemon Tahara
 Kowagaru hitobito (1994) - Man of iron pot, man of water-bus
 Chounouryoku-sha - Michi eno tabibito (1994)
  (1995) - Tsutaya
 Shakuhachi (1995)
 Setouchi munraito serenade (1997) - (final film role)

Television
 Taikōki (1965)
 Shōgun (1980) - Lord Kashigi Yabu, Daimyo of Izu
 Onna Taikōki (1981) - Tokugawa Ieyasu
 Taiheiki (1991) - Nagasaki Enki

Honours 
Medal with Purple Ribbon (1994)

References

External links
 
 

Japanese comedians
Japanese jazz musicians
1929 births
1996 deaths
20th-century Japanese male actors
Keio University alumni
20th-century Japanese musicians
Recipients of the Medal with Purple Ribbon
20th-century comedians